Kiar may refer to:
 Kiar County, an Iranian county in Chaharmahal and Bakhtiari Province
 Kiar, New South Wales, a suburb in the Central Coast region of New South Wales
 Martin David Kiar, a Democratic politician in Florida

See also 
 Kiara (disambiguation)
 Kjárr, a figure in North mythology